Rizgar Mohammed Amin (born 1957) is the former chief judge of the Iraqi Special Tribunal's Al-Dujail trial. He is the only judge whose name was revealed on the trial's opening on 19 October 2005, the names of the other four judges and all but two of his four colleagues faces not allowed to be shown during the televised portions of the trial.(Telegraph.co.uk - 12:30AM GMT 15 January 2006)

Amin graduated from the Law School of Baghdad University in 1980. He is an ethnic Kurd, though he has no record of political activism, or connections to the Peshmerga. He was a regional judge during the presidency of Saddam Hussein. Amin lives in Sulaymaniyah with his wife Nazanin Ahmed (born 1962) and four children, born between 1990 and 2001.

Because he had refused to join the Ba'ath party, he was only admitted to the college of judges in 1990, after working in a subordinate position for ten years. Amin was appointed chief judge of the regional court by Jalal Talabani in the mid-1990s.

On 14 January 2006, he resigned as chief judge of the trials of Saddam Hussein, due to government interference and harsh public criticism. He was replaced by Rauf Rashid Abd al-Rahman.

External links
Saddam Hussein judge to quit trial, friend says, Guardian Unlimited 14 January 2006
Saddam trial judge offers to quit, BBC News 15 January 2006
Pressure on Saddam judge to stay in job, Guardian Unlimited 16 January 2006
 Iraq court names new Saddam judge, BBC News 23 January 2006

20th-century Iraqi judges
Iraqi Kurdish people
1957 births
Living people
University of Baghdad alumni
21st-century Iraqi judges